Cecilia Ehrling, (born 22 May 1984) is a Swedish competitive dancer. She has won the TV4 dance show Let's Dance three times, in 2007 along with Martin Lidberg and in 2010 with Mattias Andréasson and in 2013 she won with Markoolio. She has participated in the dance show every year since the 2007, dancing with celebrities like Richard Herrey, Anders Bagge, Anders Timell and Steffo Törnquist. In 2015, competed in Let's Dance 2015 where she teamed up with Ingemar Stenmark. She participated in Let's Dance 2016 with Johan Rabaeus the couple became the second to be voted off.

She has also competed in Eurovision Dance Contest 2007 along with Martin Lidberg, the couple placed 14th after the voting.

References

External links

Living people
1984 births
Swedish female dancers